Bushnell Township is located in McDonough County, Illinois. As of the 2010 census, its population was 3,272 and it contained 1,511 housing units.

Geography

Demographics

References

External links
City-data.com
Illinois State Archives

Townships in McDonough County, Illinois
Townships in Illinois